Nina Station is an unincorporated community in St. Martin Parish, Louisiana, United States. It lies at an elevation of 20 feet (6 m).

References

Unincorporated communities in St. Martin Parish, Louisiana
Unincorporated communities in Louisiana
Lafayette metropolitan area, Louisiana